Corning may refer to:

People 
 Corning (surname)

Places 
In Canada:
 Corning, Saskatchewan

In the United States of America:
 Corning, Arkansas
 Corning, California
 Corning, Indiana
 Corning, Iowa
 Corning, Kansas
 Corning, Michigan
 Corning, Minnesota
 Corning, Missouri
 Corning (city), New York
 Corning (town), New York
 Corning, Ohio
 Corning, Pennsylvania
 Corning, Wisconsin

Businesses and organizations 
 Corning Inc., an American glass and ceramics manufacturer
 Dow Corning
 Owens Corning
 Corning Museum of Glass

Other uses 

 Corning (gunpowder), a gunpowder manufacturing process that improves consistency and power
 Salt-curing or Pickling with salt; salting